The purple-throated sunbird (Leptocoma sperata), is a species of bird in the family Nectariniidae. 
Its natural habitats are lowland tropical forests and subtropical or tropical mangrove forest of Maratua and the Philippines.

The Van Hasselt's sunbird was previously considered conspecific.

Taxonomy
In 1760 the French zoologist Mathurin Jacques Brisson included a description of the purple-throated sunbird in his Ornithologie based on a specimen collected in the Philippines. He used the French name Le grimpereau pourpré des Philippines and the Latin Certhia Philippensis Purpurea. Although Brisson coined Latin names, these do not conform to the binomial system and are not recognised by the International Commission on Zoological Nomenclature. When in 1766 the Swedish naturalist Carl Linnaeus updated his Systema Naturae for the twelfth edition, he added 240 species that had been previously described by Brisson. One of these was the purple-throated sunbird. Linnaeus included a brief description, coined the binomial name Certhia sperata and cited Brisson's work. Linnaeus specified the type location as the Philippines but this was subsequently restricted to Manila. The specific name sperata is Latin for "bride" or "betrothed". The species is now placed in the genus Leptocoma that was introduced by the German ornithologist Jean Cabanis in 1850.

Four subspecies are recognised:
 L. s. henkei (Meyer, AB, 1884) – north Luzon
 L. s. sperata (Linnaeus, 1766) – central and south Luzon, Polillo Island, Marinduque and Catanduanes (north Philippines)
 L. s. trochilus (Salomonsen, 1953) – west, central and south Philippines (except west and south Mindanao and Sulu Archipelago)
 L. s. juliae (Tweeddale, 1877) – west and south Mindanao and Sulu Archipelago

References

Rasmussen, P.C., and J.C. Anderton. 2005. Birds of South Asia. The Ripley guide. Volume 2: attributes and status. Smithsonian Institution and Lynx Edicions, Washington D.C. and Barcelona.

External links

purple-throated sunbird
Endemic birds of the Philippines
purple-throated sunbird
purple-throated sunbird
Taxonomy articles created by Polbot